Salem Town Hall is a historic town hall located at Winston-Salem, Forsyth County, North Carolina, United States.  It was designed by architect Willard C. Northup and built in 1912.  It is a two-story brick building with stone, cement and wood trim.  It features a three-story corner bell tower and has Italianate and local Moravian design elements. The building housed the Salem Town offices until it consolidated with the town of Winston in 1913, then moved to the newly built Winston-Salem City Hall in 1926.  The building continued to be used as a fire station until the mid 1970s. It was subsequently renovated into offices.

It was listed on the National Register of Historic Places in 1983.

References

City and town halls on the National Register of Historic Places in North Carolina
Italianate architecture in North Carolina
Government buildings completed in 1912
Buildings and structures in Winston-Salem, North Carolina
National Register of Historic Places in Winston-Salem, North Carolina
1912 establishments in North Carolina
City and town halls in North Carolina